The Vipeholm experiments were a series of human experiments where patients of Vipeholm Hospital for the intellectually disabled in Lund, Sweden, were fed large amounts of sweets to provoke dental caries (1945–1955). The experiments were sponsored both by the sugar industry and the dentist community, in an effort to determine whether carbohydrates affected the formation of cavities.

The experiments provided extensive knowledge about dental health and resulted in enough empirical data to link the intake of sugar to dental caries. However, today they are considered to have violated the principles of medical ethics.

History 

The National Dental Service in Sweden was started in 1938. The dental health in Sweden at that time was not well observed, and cases of cavities were widespread. It was suspected that diets rich in sugar caused tooth decay, but there was no scientific proof. In 1945 the then-Medical Board commissioned a study. This was the start of the Vipeholm experiments.

Vipeholm, outside Lund, was the country's largest facility for "uneducable retards" and was chosen to be the site of the largest experiment ever run on humans in Sweden at that time.  Up until 1947, Vipeholm employees had also been part of the experiment, but this was stopped, since it was soon found that there was no way of monitoring their intake of sweets.

What began in 1945 as government-sanctioned vitamin trials were converted in 1947 without the knowledge of the government. The researchers decided, in consultation with the Medical Board, to start to use sugar instead, to encourage tooth decay by using an extremely sweet and sticky diet.

From 1947–1949, a group of patients were used as subjects in a full-scale experiment designed to bring about tooth decay. They were fed copious amounts of sweets, some which was not available commercially but specially formulated toffee to make it stick better to teeth, which resulted in many of them having their teeth completely ruined. Nonetheless, the researchers felt that, scientifically speaking, the experiment was a huge success.

The sugar experiment lasted for two years. In 1949, the trials were revised again, now to test a more "normal" carbohydrate-rich diet. By then, the teeth of about fifty of the 660 subjects in the experiment had been completely ruined.

One of the practical results of the study was the recommendation that it was better for children's teeth to eat sweets once per week, compared to a smaller total amount spread out over most of the week.

Delayed results 
The confectionery industry donated huge sums of money and tons of chocolates and caramels to fund the experiments.  Because the experiments had shown a clear link between sugar intake and dental cavities, the industry was not pleased with the results, and the researchers delayed their publication.  When the study was finally made public in 1953, a critical debate arose about why they had been held back for so long.

The scientists were accused of having been bought by the industry. However, at the time there was not any public debate about the ethics of the experiments themselves. Modern attitudes in the dental profession are very different: a participant in the Vipeholm study, B. Krasse, writes "It is obvious that a research ethics committee would not accept a project like the Vipeholm Study today." He explains "The need for the study was obvious to us as dentists" and states that the Swedish Parliament and then the news media debated the ethics of the study as early as 1953.

Revelations 
It was not until the 1990s that studies appeared about the ethical aspects of the Vipeholm experiments. In 2000, the Swedish ombudsman for the disabled reported that the "excesses" of the study were not justified by the results.

Elin Bommenel, a historian and doctoral student at Linköping University, performed a thorough study of the Vipeholm experiments in her dissertation, published in 2006. She was the first researcher to gain access to the original documents from the experimental period at Vipeholm. Her research describes how the scientists found themselves caught between the divergent goals of research and patient care as well as being under immense pressure from both political and economic interests. Three short, filmed lectures are available (English subtitles) on Youtube.

References 

Social history of Sweden
History of dentistry
History of sugar
Human subject research in Sweden
Medical ethics
Intellectual disability